USS Barbara (SP-704) was a United States Navy patrol vessel in commission from 1917 to 1918.

Barbara was built as a private motorboat of the same name in 1910 by H. H. Linnell at Dorchester, Massachusetts. On 11 June 1917, the U.S. Navy acquired her under a free lease from her owner, Arnold Hoffman of Barrington, Rhode Island, for use as a section patrol boat during World War I. She was commissioned as USS Barbara (SP-704) on 21 June 1917.

Assigned to the section patrol in the waters around New London, Connecticut, Barbara served as a cargo and dispatch boat for the next year.

Barbara was decommissioned in June 1918. She was returned to Hoffman on 10 January 1919 and stricken from the Navy Directory the same day.

References

SP-704 Barbara at Department of the Navy Naval History and Heritage Command Online Library of Selected Images: U.S. Navy Ships -- Listed by Hull Number "SP" #s and "ID" #s -- World War I Era Patrol Vessels and other Acquired Ships and Craft numbered from SP-700 through SP-799
NavSource Online: Section Patrol Craft Photo Archive Barbara (SP 704)

Patrol vessels of the United States Navy
World War I patrol vessels of the United States
Ships built in Boston
1910 ships